Bedford Borough Council is the local authority of the Borough of Bedford in Bedfordshire, England. It is a unitary authority, having the powers of a non-metropolitan county and district council combined. The executive of the council is the directly elected mayor of Bedford. It is a member of the East of England Local Government Association.

The council was founded in 1974 as Bedford District Council, being renamed North Bedfordshire Borough Council in 1975. In 1992 it changed its name again to become Bedford Borough Council. Until 2009 it was a lower-tier district council, with county-level services provided by Bedfordshire County Council. On 1 April 2009, the Bedfordshire County Council ceased to exist, at which point Bedford Borough Council became a unitary authority.

Political control 

Since the first election to the council in 1973 (as a shadow authority prior to coming into its powers in 1974), political control of the council has been held by the following parties:

Arms
Bedford has been granted two distinct coats of arms. The first is per pale Argent and Gules a fess Azure, and the second Argent an eagle displayed wings inverted and head turned towards the sinister Sable ducally crowned and surmounted by a castle of three tiers Or.

References

External links 
 Bedford Borough Council

Unitary authority councils of England
Local education authorities in England
Local authorities in Bedfordshire
Mayor and cabinet executives
Billing authorities in England
Borough of Bedford